Cân i Gymru 2011 was the forty-second edition of S4C's Cân i Gymru, an annual Welsh singing contest. The 2011 was broadcast live on 6 March 2011 from the Pontrhydfendigaid Pavilion, Pontrhydfendigaid. The winner was given an invitation to represent Wales at the Pan Celtic Festival. The final was hosted by former winner Elin Fflur.

Format
S4C and Avanti invited composers and authors to send in their songs from 8 November 2010 and were given a closing date of 7 January 2011. The 8 finalists were announced on 22 February 2011.

A panel of judges evaluated each entry before submitting a shortlist of eight songs to be performed live on the show. The winning composer(s)/author(s) were awarded a £7,500 prize and got an invitation to enter their song into the Pan Celtic Festival in Ireland.

The winner of Cân i Gymru 2011 was decided by a 50% jury vote and 50% televote.

Entrants

External links
  Cân i Gymru website
 S4C website

2011 in Wales
S4C original programming
2011
2011 song contests